Alexandru Constantin Stan (born 7 February 1989) is a Romanian footballer who plays as a left back for CS Tunari. In his career, Stan also played for teams such as Progresul București, Astra Ploiești or Concordia Chiajna, among others.

Career statistics

Club

Honours

Club 

Astra Giurgiu
 Liga I (1): 2015–16

FCSB

 Cupa României: 2019–20

References

External links
 Player profile at FC Astra's official website 
 
 

1989 births
Living people
Footballers from Bucharest
Romanian footballers
Association football defenders
Liga I players
Liga II players
FC Progresul București players
FC Astra Giurgiu players
CS Turnu Severin players
CS Concordia Chiajna players
FC Politehnica Iași (2010) players